Van Paemel may refer to:

Monika van Paemel (born 1945), Belgian writer
The van Paemel Family, 1986 Belgian film